The Fourteenth Amendment of the Constitution of India, officially known as The Constitution (Fourteenth Amendment) Act, 1962, incorporated Pondicherry (now Puducherry) as the ninth Union territory of India, and also gave Parliament the authority to create by law, Legislatures and Councils of Ministers for the Union territories of Himachal Pradesh, Manipur, Tripura, Goa, Daman and Diu and Puducherry.

The French establishments of Pondicherry, Karikal, Mahé and Yanam became territories of the Indian Union on 16 August 1962, with the ratification of the Treaty of Cession by India and France. The 14th Amendment came into effect on 28 December 1962.

Text

Constitutional changes
Section 2 of the amendment amended article 81(1) (b) of the Constitution in order to raise the maximum number of seats in the Lok Sabha for members representing the Union territories from 20 to 25, thus enabling representation to be given to the Union territory of Pondicherry. The First Schedule to the Constitution was amended to include the territories of Pondicherry with effect from 16 August 1962. The Fourth Schedule to the Constitution was amended to allocate one seat in Rajya Sabha to the Union territory of Pondicherry.

The insertion of a new article 239A in the Constitution gave Parliament the authority to create by law, Legislatures and Councils of Ministers for the Union territories of Himachal Pradesh, Manipur, Tripura, Goa, Daman and Diu and Pondicherry. Section 4 of the Amendment provided that any law passed for this purpose would not be deemed to be an amendment of the Constitution for the purpose of article 368. Clause (1) of article 240 of the Constitution was amended to include the Union territory of Pondicherry in order to enable the President to "make regulations for the peace, progress and good government" of the territory. However, the President would cease to make regulations, when any body is created under the new article 239A to function as a Legislature for Union territories of Goa, Daman and Diu or Pondicherry, with effect from the date appointed for the first meeting of such Legislature.

Proposal and enactment
The Constitution (Fourteenth Amendment) Bill, 1962 (Bill No. 86 of 1962) was introduced in the Lok Sabha on 30 August 1962. It was introduced by Lal Bahadur Shastri, then Minister of Home Affairs, and sought to amend articles 81 and 240, and the First and the Fourth Schedules to the Constitution. It also sought to insert a new article 239A in the Constitution. The full text of the Statement of Objects and Reasons appended to the bill is given below:

The bill was considered and passed, with some modifications, by the Lok Sabha on 4 September 1962. The bill passed by the Lok Sabha, was debated and passed by the Rajya Sabha on 7 September 1962. Clauses 1, 2, 3 and 5 to 7 of the Bill were adopted, in the original form, by the Lok Sabha and the Rajya Sabha on 4 and 7 September 1962, respectively. Clause 4 of the Bill sought to insert a new article 239A in the Constitution, which would empower Parliament to create by law, Legislatures and Councils of Ministers for certain Union territories. Hari Vishnu Kamath moved an amendment to Clause 4 in the Lok Sabha, which sought to omit the words "nominated or" after the word "whether" in clause 1(a) of the new article 239A,  be omitted. The amended Clause 4 was adopted by the Lok Sabha, and later by the Rajya Sabha. The effect of the amendment was that the Legislatures of the Union territories could not be wholly nominated bodies.

The bill received assent from then President Sarvepalli Radhakrishnan on 28 December 1962, and came into force on the same date. It was notified in The Gazette of India on 29 December 1962.

Ratification
The Act was passed in accordance with the provisions of Article 368 of the Constitution, and was ratified by half of the State Legislatures, as required under Clause (2) of the said article. State Legislatures that ratified the amendment are listed below:

 Andhra Pradesh
 Jammu and Kashmir
 Kerala
 Madras
 Maharashtra
 Mysore
 East Punjab
 Rajasthan
 Uttar Pradesh
 West Bengal

Did not ratify:
 Assam
 Bihar
 Gujarat
 Madhya Pradesh
 Orissa

See also
List of amendments of the Constitution of India

References

14
1962 in India
1962 in law
Nehru administration